Albert Horne "Peter" Burchfield, III is a former National Hockey League co-owner of the Pittsburgh Penguins starting on April 21, 1971.  He made his fortune as the longtime executive of the Joseph Horne Company department store also based in Pittsburgh.

External links

Businesspeople from Pittsburgh
Pittsburgh Penguins owners